Hydrogenophaga soli is a Gram-negative, rod-shaped, strictly aerobic and motile bacterium from the genus of Hydrogenophaga which has been isolated from soil from a rice field from Goyang in Korea.

References

External links
Type strain of Hydrogenophaga soli at BacDive -  the Bacterial Diversity Metadatabase

Comamonadaceae
Bacteria described in 2017